Luke Alexander Potter (born 17 July 1989) is an English former professional footballer who last played for Barnsley as a defender. He is currently the interim assistant manager at Guiseley.

Career
Born in Barnsley, Potter made his league debut in Barnsley's final fixture of the 2006–07 season, in which Barnsley lost 7–0 at West Bromwich Albion.

He has had three loan spells away from Oakwell. In late 2007 he spent two months on loan at Conference National team Stafford Rangers, and on January transfer window deadline day 2009, joined Kettering Town until the end of the 2008–09 season.
Potter announced his retirement from football on 3 April 2012, after suffering from a long recurring knee injury.

After retiring, he worked as a coach at the Barnsley academy and was assistant manager at Ossett Albion for four years. In September 2017 he was appointed manager of Athersley Recreation. He resigned from the role in May 2019. In June 2019, he was appointed assistant coach at Matlock Town. Potter left the club on 22 January 2020 together with head coach Steve Kittrick.

On the 11th of April, Potter became Assistant Manager to Kittrick once again at Guiseley on an interim basis, following the dismissal of Marcus Bignot and Russ O’Neill.

References

External links
Luke Potter profile at the Barnsley website

1989 births
Living people
Footballers from Barnsley
English footballers
Association football defenders
Barnsley F.C. players
Stafford Rangers F.C. players
Kettering Town F.C. players
Alfreton Town F.C. players
English Football League players
National League (English football) players
English football managers
Athersley Recreation F.C. managers
Barnsley F.C. non-playing staff